Jamie Shewchuk (born August 5, 1985 in Edmonton, Alberta) is a lacrosse player on the Colorado Mammoth. Shewchuk was the Colorado Mammoth's number 25 overall pick for the 2006 draft.

During the 2007 season, Shewchuk was named Rookie of the Week for week 6, and was also named to the All-Rookie team.

After four years in Colorado, Shewchuk was traded during the 2011 season along with a 2012 draft pick to the Minnesota Swarm for Tim Campeau and a 2011 draft pick. Shewchuk finished the 2011 season in Minnesota, but returned to the Mammoth for the 2012 season. After missing the 2013 season, Shewchuk was again signed by the Mammoth for 2014.

Shewchuk is also an instructor at the US Box Lacrosse Academy.

Stats

NLL
Reference:

References

External links
 Colorado Mammoth Bio Page

1985 births
Living people
Canadian lacrosse players
Colorado Mammoth players
Minnesota Swarm players
Sportspeople from Edmonton